Strangeways Here We Come is an English comedy drama, written and directed by Chris Green, in which a group of residents in a council estate decide to defeat a cruel loan shark who has been making their lives miserable. It was filmed in Salford. The name is taken from the Smiths’ album of the same name.

Cast
 Elaine Cassidy as Steph
 James Cooney as Ollie
 Oliver Coopersmith as Aaron
 Chanel Cresswell as Becki
 Perry Fitzpatrick as Marvin
 James Foster as Brian
 Saffron Hocking as Sian
 Michelle Keegan as Demi
 Stephen Lord as Nolan
 Mark Sheals as Max
 Lauren Socha as Shelley
 Ania Sowinski as Jean
 Nina Wadia as Lucy
 Ste Johnston as Gary

Background
The film's writer and director, Chris Green, said: “This was made by someone who lived there. Growing up on Spike Island we saw a lot of violence. I can honestly say that 90 per cent of what you see in that film is true - its stuff I’ve seen, stuff I’ve experienced or know about. Apart from the murder, obviously."

Reception
Upon its release in 2018, Strangeways Here We Come garnered overwhelmingly negative reviews from critics. The Times rated the film zero stars, and Mike McCahill, reviewing for The Guardian, rated the film 1/5 stars, commenting that critics would be "torn between highlighting those actors who make a few scenes tolerable or granting them the anonymity they surely longed for as they fled the cast-and-crew screening with heads under blankets." Benjamin Poole, for themoviewaffler.com, wrote "Vile stereotypes of people at the tough end of the social scale, disdainful representations seemingly designed to comfort and entertain those fortunate enough to never have to go near social housing."

In 2022, the film saw increased popularity on Netflix, appearing on the streaming site's "Most Watched" list. Green told Manchester Evening News: "I'm glad for everyone involved, and I’m proud to have come from Salford and being able to turn my experiences into entertainment. I’m not a multi-millionaire but I am doing the job that I love, writing for film and TV and telling the stories that inspire me."

Commercial reception
Strangeways Here We Come grossed $3,473 worldwide.

External links
Official website

References

2018 independent films
2018 comedy-drama films
British comedy-drama films
Films set in England
Films shot in Lancashire
Films shot in Greater Manchester
2010s English-language films
2010s British films